Erika Shields is an American law enforcement officer. She previously served as the chief of police of the Louisville Metro Police Department from January 2021 to January 2023. She was previously the 24th chief of police of the Atlanta Police Department from 2016 to 2020.

Early life and education 
Shields is a native of Morris, New York. She earned a bachelor of arts degree in international studies from Webster University and a master's degree in criminal justice from Saint Leo University.

Career 
Before joining the Atlanta Police Department as a patrol officer in 1995, Chief Shields worked as a stockbroker in Boston. She was the second woman to lead the Atlanta Police Department, and the first openly gay person to do so.

On December 1, 2016, Atlanta Mayor Kasim Reed announced that he had selected Shields to succeed Chief George N. Turner, who was retiring.

In May 2020, amid protests in Atlanta in response to the murder of George Floyd, Shields said that the angry reaction was understandable, and that the value of the lives of black people was being diminished by police or other individuals, stating that such events were a "recurring narrative". She added with some suggestions on how police could do better, namely better training and "weeding out bad cops", and praised the use of body-worn cameras. Shields addressed demonstrators stating that she was happy to allow protests so long as they didn't violate laws. She stated her opposition to using force to halt the protests, stating that protestors have a right "to be upset, to be scared, and to want to yell".

On June 13, 2020, Shields resigned after a video went viral of an officer fatally shooting a black man, Rayshard Brooks, who resisted arrest.

In January 2021, she joined the Louisville Police Department.

References

External links 
 TEDxCentennialParkWomen talk: Leaders Show Up

Living people
Louisville Metro Police Department officers
Chiefs of the Atlanta Police Department
LGBT law enforcement workers
LGBT people from Kentucky
LGBT people from Georgia (U.S. state)
Year of birth missing (living people)
Webster University alumni
Saint Leo University alumni